Dr. Know is a program dedicated to debunking various rumours and popular misconceptions in the realm of personal health. The show featured Dr. Paul Trotman, a New Zealand physician in fields such as internal medicine and obstetrics/gynecology, who is described by one reviewer as a "medical myth buster". The show aired in 20 parts as a half-hour format on The Discovery Health Channel.  In 2008, the series began airing on Science Channel.  It is filmed in and around Washington, D.C.

Cast 
Paul Trotman...Host
Manny Oliverez...Lab Rat
Christian Arriola...Lab Rat

References

External links 
Dr. Know Videos at Discovery Fit & Health
Series IMDB Site
Actor IMDB Site

American non-fiction television series
2008 American television series debuts
Year of television series ending missing
Discovery Health Channel original programming